The County of Tecklenburg was a state of the Holy Roman Empire, located in the present German state of North Rhine-Westphalia and Lower Saxony.

History
In the 12th century the county of Tecklenburg emerged in the region that is now called the "Tecklenburger Land" in the western foothills of the Teutoburg Forest.

Following the extinction of the counts of Tecklenburg in 1262, it was annexed by the neighbouring County of Bentheim in 1263. Between 1328 and 1562 it was ruled by the Counts of Schwerin. In 1365 they acquired the Lordship of Rheda, but in 1400 they lost the northern parts of the county with the districts of Cloppenburg, Friesoythe and Bevergern to the Prince-Bishopric of Münster.

 was the first ruler in Westphalia to introduce the Reformation and became a member of the Schmalkaldic League. Following the defeat of the League, the county of Tecklenburg was forced to cede territories to Charles V to form the County of Lingen. In 1557, in conflict with the claims of the House of Solms-Braunfels, the county was inherited by Arnold II (IV) of Bentheim-Tecklenburg whose son Adolf founded a new line of counts of Tecklenburg. In 1588 the counts introduced Calvinism to Tecklenburg.

In 1696 the County of Tecklenburg was ceded to the House of Solms. In 1707 Count William Maurice of Solms-Braunfels sold Tecklenburg to Prussia. In the Berlin Treaty of 1729 the comital house of Bentheim-Tecklenburg abandoned all claims to the county.

The county was mediatised to the Grand Duchy of Berg in 1808. Tecklenburg was annexed by France in 1810 together with many northwest German regions. The Congress of Vienna returned Tecklenburg to Prussia in 1816.

See also
Bentheim-Tecklenburg

External links
Map of Lower Saxony in 1789

Bibliography

Tecklenburg, County of
11th-century establishments in the Holy Roman Empire
1808 disestablishments
 
Lower Rhenish-Westphalian Circle